Neodymium(III) oxalate is the oxalate salt of neodymium, with the chemical formula of Nd2(C2O4)3 in the anhydrous or hydrate form. Its decahydrate decomposes to the anhydrous form when heated, and when heated further, decomposes to Nd2O2C2O4, finally obtaining neodymium(III) oxide. It dissolves in hydrochloric acid to form Nd(C2O4)Cl·3H2O.

References

Neodymium compounds
Oxalates